Individual-wheel drive or IWD is a wheeled vehicle with a drivetrain that allows all wheels to receive torque from several motors independent of each other. The term was coined to identify those electric vehicles whereby each wheel is driven by its own individual electric motor.

These vehicles inherently have a range of characteristics built-in that are more commonly attributed to four-wheel drive vehicles or vehicles with extensive control systems. These characteristics can be:
 Four-wheel drive, i.e. the distribution of available power to all the wheels of a four-wheeled vehicle.
 Anti-lock braking system
 Anti-skid

Other features
 If one motor fails, the other motors are powerful enough to drive the vehicle to the nearest repair shop.
 Low maintenance.
 Easy replacement of motors.
 No central gear box.
 No mechanical differentials or lockers.
 No long and heavy drive shafts.
 On the spot, tank/wheelchair-like turning.
 On the fly switching between FWD, RWD and AWD drive configurations.

The motors that are used in these vehicles are commonly wheel hub motors, since no transmission components are then required. Alternative layouts with inboard motors and drive shafts are also possible.

Hydraulic Wheel Drive 
Hydraulic wheel drives share many of the same features as an electric wheel drive. They also lack the need for a central gear box, mechanical differentials, drive shafts, and provide on the fly switching between FWD, RWD, and AWD. Hydraulic individual wheel drives are standard in various machines, such as Zero Turn mowers, Multi One lifts / front end loaders, and forklifts. Hydraulic drives are primarily found in machines that serve uses which benefit from the ability to turn on a dime and move between forward and reverse modes without shifting gears, such as lawn mowers and loading equipment.

Although one may be conflicted in considering such systems as a direct drive system, being that a motorized pump must drive the hydraulic system from a position other than the wheel hub. Nonetheless the drive is provided directly from the hydraulic rotary motor found in or adjacent to the wheel hub.

See also
 Direct-drive mechanism

References

Car layouts